Sandie Clair (born 1 April 1988) is a French professional racing cyclist and bobsledder. She won her first title in 2005 in the national junior sprint championship. It qualified her for the European junior championship in Fiorenzuola, where she won the sprint and rode the keirin and 500m time trial. She came third in the junior world 500m championship a month later.

She won two medals at the world junior championship in 2006, then at Ghent, won the world championship 500m and came third in the sprint. She rode World Cup meetings throughout 2007 and 2008 and won the team sprint with Clara Sanchez at Cali in 2008.

She came third in the 500m world championship at Manchester in 2008. From 2007 to 2010, she won eight titles at the éspoir level in the European championships, including three in the team sprint with Virginie Cueff.

In 2010, she won four medals, including three at the European éspoir championship in St Petersburg. In November, she won the sprint and team sprint championships at the élite European championship in Pruszków, riding the team sprint with Sanchez.

She represented France at the 2012 Summer Olympics (in the women's team sprint) and the 2016 Summer Olympics (in the women's sprint and the team sprint.)

Palmarès

2005
1st Sprint, French National Track Championships, Juniors
3rd European Championship, Track, Sprint, Juniors (F), Fiorenzuola
3rd 500 m, UCI Track Cycling World Championships, Juniors

2006
2nd 500 m, European Track Championships, Juniors, Athens
3rd Keirin, European Track Championships, Juniors, Athens
1st 500 m, UCI B Track Cycling World Championships, Juniors, Ghent
3rd Sprint, UCI Track Cycling World Championships, Juniors, Ghent
3rd Moscow, Team Sprint (RUS)

2007
1st 500 m, European Track Championships, U23, Cottbus (GER)
3rd Sydney, Team Sprint (AUS)
2nd Beijing, Team Sprint (CHN)

2008
2nd Los Angeles, Team Sprint (USA)
UEC European U23 Track Championships
1st  500m Time Trial
1st  Team Sprint (with Virginie Cueff)
2nd  Keirin

2009
3rd 500m, 2009–2010 Track World Cup 
UEC European U23 Track Championships
1st  500m Time Trial
1st  Team Sprint (with Virginie Cueff)

2010
UEC European U23 Track Championships
1st  Keirin 
1st  500m Time Trial
1st  Team Sprint (with Virginie Cueff)
3rd  Sprint

2014
Fenioux Piste International
1st Sprint
1st Team sprint (with Virginie Cueff)
2nd Keirin
Fenioux Trophy Piste
1st Sprint
1st 500m Time Trial
GP von Deutschland im Sprint
2nd Team Sprint (with Virginie Cueff)
3rd Sprint
South East Asian GP Track (1)
3rd Keirin
3rd Sprint
3rd Sprint, South East Asian GP Track (2)
South East Asian GP Track (3)
3rd Keirin
3rd Sprint
Grand Prix de Vitesse de Saint-Denis
3rd Keirin
3rd Sprint
3rd Team Sprint, Open des Nations sur Piste de Roubaix (with Virginie Cueff)
2015
Grand Prix de Vitesse de Saint-Denis
1st Keirin
2nd Sprint
2nd Keirin, Revolution - Round 1, Derby
2nd Keirin, Trofeu CAR Anadia Portugal
2016
2nd Sprint, Fenioux Piste International
2017
Fenioux Piste International
1st Keirin
2nd Sprint

References

External links

1988 births
Living people
French female cyclists
French track cyclists
Cyclists at the 2012 Summer Olympics
Cyclists at the 2016 Summer Olympics
Olympic cyclists of France
Sportspeople from Toulon
Cyclists at the 2019 European Games
European Games competitors for France
French female bobsledders
Cyclists from Provence-Alpes-Côte d'Azur